KZHN (1250 AM) is a radio station broadcasting a Talk Radio format. Licensed to Paris, Texas, United States, the station serves the Paris area.  The station is currently owned by Larry Ryan D/B/a Eifel Tower Broadcasting.

History
The station went on the air in 1950 as KFTV, and in the late 50s as KPRE through the 80s and later as KGDD on 1990-03-01.  On 1999-10-01, the station changed its call sign to KPJC. On 2005-10-19 to the current KZHN.

References

External links

ZHN
Radio stations established in 1950